Jack Sanders (8 August 1904 – 24 August 1990) was an Australian rules footballer who played with North Melbourne in the Victorian Football League (VFL).

Family
The youngest child born to Michael Patrick Sanders (1872–1921) and Margaret Sanders, nee Walsh (1869–1929), William James Sanders was born at Warrenheip on 8 August 1904. He was known as Jack Sanders during his football career.

Football
Sanders joined North Melbourne from the local C.Y.M.S. team for the 1926 season and played a single senior game against South Melbourne in Round 16 of that season.

Death
Sanders died at Ferntree Gully on 24 August 1990 and was cremated at Springvale Botanical Cemetery.

Notes

External links 

1904 births
1990 deaths
Australian rules footballers from Ballarat
North Melbourne Football Club players